Konstantinos Tsiaras (born 1966) is a Greek politician and member of New Democracy. He currently serves as the Minister for Justice in the Cabinet of Kyriakos Mitsotakis. He is a member of the Hellenic Parliament for Karditsa and is a former Deputy Foreign Minister. In addition to Greek, his native language, he speaks English, French, German, Italian, and Russian.

Education
Tsiaras graduated from the School of Medicine at Dimokriteion University of Thrace, with a specialization in microbiology-biopathology. He received his doctorate from the University of Athens Medical School.

References

External links

  
 
 Konstantinos Tsiaras Discusses the Diaspora, Reforms in Greece (in English)

1966 births
Living people
Greek MPs 2004–2007
Greek MPs 2007–2009
Greek MPs 2009–2012
Greek MPs 2012 (May)
Greek MPs 2012–2014
Greek MPs 2015 (February–August)
Greek MPs 2015–2019
Greek MPs 2019–2023
Justice ministers of Greece
New Democracy (Greece) politicians
People from Karditsa